FK Polet Ljubić (Serbian Cyrillic: ФК Полет Љубић) is a football club based in Ljubić, Čačak, Serbia. They currently play in the Serbian League West, a third tier in Serbia's football league, and spent the 2001–02 season in the Serbian First League.

References

External links
 Club profile and squad at Srbijafudbal

Football clubs in Serbia
Association football clubs established in 1937
1937 establishments in Serbia